Richard J. Leary is an American and Canadian civil servant who has been the chief executive officer (CEO) of the Toronto Transit Commission (TTC) since 2017. Leary became interim CEO in 2017 following the departure of Andy Byford and took over the role permanently in 2018. Leary was previously general manager of York Region Transit and held senior roles with the Massachusetts Bay Transportation Authority (MBTA).

Personal life and education
Richard J. Leary was born in Boston, Massachusetts. His father was a streetcar operator for the Massachusetts Bay Transportation Authority (MBTA). He graduated from Northeastern University with a BBA and an MPA. As well, he completed a graduate program from Harvard University in Administration and Management.

In August 2019, Leary became a Canadian citizen.

Transportation career

Massachusetts Bay Transportation Authority
Following his father, Leary began working for the Massachusetts Bay Transportation Authority as a subway attendant in 1984. He then moved through various manager and director roles, becoming the chief operating officer of the MBTA in 2005. He retired from the role in November 2009.

York Regional Transit 
In 2009, Leary moved to Canada to become the general manager of York Region Transit in Ontario. Leary was praised as ridership grew by 4 million while customer complaints reduced and vehicle reliability increased.

Toronto Transit Commission
In 2014, Leary was hired as the chief service officer of the Toronto Transit Commission (TTC) by then-CEO Andy Byford. This role involved management of the TTC's bus and streetcar systems, as well as management of the various Toronto subway stations. Leary's achievements included a large reduction in the number of Short turns, improving the quality of service.

In December 2017, Leary was made the interim CEO of the TTC, when his predecessor, Andy Byford left to head the New York City Transit Authority. In July 2018, Leary's interim position was made permanent, following an international search.

References 

American urban planners
People from Boston
1963 births
Living people
Northeastern University alumni
Harvard University alumni
American chief executives
Toronto Transit Commission general managers
American emigrants to Canada